John S. Burke Catholic High School, referred to locally as Burke Catholic, is an American private, Roman Catholic high school in  Goshen, New York, and is located within the Roman Catholic Archdiocese of New York. Burke Catholic is the only Catholic high school located in Orange County.

The school's colors are blue and white, with its sports teams, the Burke Catholic Eagles, carrying on those colors. Occasionally, silver is added to the school's colors. 

The school motto is Non Vox Sed Votum, Latin for "Not Words But Deeds".

John Douthit and Janice Clark have been the school's principals since 2017.

In May 2008, connecting acres of land to the school were bought by the archdiocese.

Background
The school was established in 1899. It was originally staffed by the Sisters of Charity and previously called St. John's Academic School, Garr Institute and St. John's High School.

In 1963, a new building was built at its current location and renamed for John Stephen Burke, a New York City philanthropist.

General Martin Dempsey, a 1970 graduate of Burke Catholic and former Chairman of the Joint Chiefs of Staff, delivered the commencement address at the class of 2012's graduation held at West Point.

Demographics
In the 2016–2017  school year, there is a total of 400 students attending Burke Catholic. The student-teacher ratio is 16.1.

Operating independently of the archdiocese
On January 27, 2009, it was announced that the Archdiocese of New York would allow all Catholic high schools to operate independently, including John S. Burke Catholic High School. The archdiocese said this action stemmed from a desire for a more efficient operation of the schools and that a local, independent board of directors would oversee the activities of the school.

Notes and references

External links
 , the school's official website
 Football Website

1899 establishments in New York (state)
Catholic secondary schools in New York (state)
Educational institutions established in 1899
Burke
Schools in Orange County, New York